Cybernetica may refer to:

Cybernetica  (Norwegian company), company developing systems for model predictive control (MPC)
Cybernetica (Estonian company), company developing systems for Internet voting
Cybernetica, Journal of the International Association for Cybernetics (Namur), see Cybernetic art

See also
Principia Cybernetica, international cooperation of scientists in the field of cybernetics and systems science